Toponym'elles is an initiative that was started to improve toponymic representation of women's contributions to Montreal by renaming public spaces such as parks and streets, as only 6% of places were named after women. Initially, Toponym'elles was created to include 375 names to commemorate the 375th anniversary of Montreal's founding. As of November 2021, the list had been expanded to include 450 names. Thérèse Cadorette was the first woman to be honoured by this initiative, with a square being named after her in 2016. Two columnists from La Presse, Nathalie Petrowski and François Cardinal, proposed several names of women to be added to Toponym'elles: Nelly Arcan, Annie MacDonald Langstaff, Monique Fitz-Back, Michelle Tisseyre, Josée Yvon, Joséphine Marchand, Robertine Barry, Laure Conan, and Rosanna Eleanor Leprohon.

See also 
 Commission de toponymie du Québec – Toponymy Commission of Québec
 French personal pronouns – nouns in French have a grammatical gender, elle is a feminine pronoun
 Idola Saint-Jean – her efforts lead to women being granted the right to vote in Quebec
 Jeanne Mance – she founded Hôtel-Dieu de Montréal in 1645
 Justine Lacoste-Beaubien
 Marguerite Bourgeoys
 Thérèse Casgrain

References

External links 
 Official toponyms in Quebec
 The name bank for Toponym'Elles

Parks in Montreal
Buildings and structures in Montreal
Names of places in Canada